Scissurella ornata, common name the ornate slit shell, is a species of minute sea snail, a marine gastropod mollusk or micromollusk in the family Scissurellidae, the little slit snails.

Description
The size of the shell varies between 1 mm and 2 mm.

Distribution
This marine species occurs off New South Wales, Victoria and Tasmania, Australia.

References

 Iredale, T. & McMichael, D.F., 1962. A reference list of the marine Mollusca of New South Wales. Mem. Aust. Mus., 11:0-0.
 Wilson, B., 1993. Australian Marine Shells. Prosobranch Gastropods. Odyssey Publishing, Kallaroo, WA
 Jansen, P., 1999. The Australian Scissurellidae. Conchiglia, 31(291):47-55.

External links
 To Biodiversity Heritage Library (2 publications)
 To Encyclopedia of Life
 To World Register of Marine Species
 

Scissurellidae
Gastropods described in 1908